Marcia o Crepa (March or Die), known as The Legion's Last Patrol in the UK and Commando in the US, is a 1962 European (Italian, German, Spanish) co-production war film about the Algerian War of Independence.

It was released in 1964 in the US by American International Pictures on a double feature with Torpedo Bay/Beta Som.

In the UK this film was shown at Odeon cinemas as part of a double feature with The Day of the Triffids.

Plot
French Foreign Legion Captain Le Blanc (Stewart Granger) leads a section of his Legion parachutists to capture an FLN guerrilla leader. Along the way they are joined by a prostitute (Dorian Gray) and an Arab child. Their mission is a success but when their escape helicopter is shot down they have to fight their way back to the French lines.

Cast 
 Stewart Granger : capitaine Leblanc 
 Dorian Gray : Nora
 Fausto Tozzi : Brascia
 Riccardo Garrone : Paolo
 Carlos Casaravilla : Ben Bled
 Ivo Garrani : Colonel Dionne
 Alfredo Mayo : 	Mayor
 Pablito Alonso : 	Arab Kid
 Hans von Borsody : Fritz
 Maurizio Arena : 	Dolce Vita 
 Dietmar Schönherr : 	Petit Prince
 Peter Carsten : 	Barbarossa
 Leo Anchóriz : 	Garcia

Production
The theme music Concerto Disperato by Angelo Francesco Lavagnino became a top selling instrumental in Italy performed by Nini Rosso and in the UK with a cover version by Ken Thorne reaching No. 4.

Reception
The Los Angeles Times called it "mediocre,  its timely subject matter reduced to the level of a formula Western."

The Monthly Film Bulletin said "despite up-to-date dressing this is basically a schoolboy adventure story, though somewhat grimly executed... the narrative owes more to war movies than  P.C. Wren, being a variation on the old idea of the gradual decimation of a patrol. Still, the film is an example of action all the way, apart from the gratuitously ironic ending which, though tart, comes as a decided anti-climax."

References

External links

Commando at Letterbox DVD
Commando at BFI

1962 films
1962 war films
German war drama films
Italian war drama films
Spanish war drama films
West German films
English-language German films
English-language Italian films
English-language Spanish films
Films directed by Frank Wisbar
German political drama films
Algerian War films
Films about the French Foreign Legion
American International Pictures films
Macaroni Combat films
Films shot in Almería
Films scored by Angelo Francesco Lavagnino
1960s English-language films
1960s Italian films
1960s German films